Admiral Flota Kasatonov is an  frigate of the Russian Navy and the second ship of the class.

Design
Unlike their Soviet-era predecessors, the new ships are designed for multiple roles. They are to be capable to execute long-range strikes, conduct anti-submarine warfare and to carry out escort missions.

Construction and service

Admiral Kasatonov  was laid down on 26 November 2009 at Severnaya Verf, was launched on 12 December 2014, and commissioned on 21 July 2020. The ship is named after Hero of the Soviet Union Fleet Admiral Vladimir Kasatonov. Admiral Kasatonov is assigned to the 43rd Missile Ship Division of the Russian Northern Fleet in Severomorsk. In 2020, the previous hull number 431 was replaced by 461. 

Following her commissioning, the ship conducted anti-submarine exercises in the Barents Sea and, on 29 September 2020, fired a Kalibr cruise missile from the White Sea against a ground target located at a training range in the Arkhangelsk region. Between 2019 and 2020 she tested a new anti-submarine weapon system Otvet.

2021 
Admiral Kasatonov left her homeport of Severomorsk for her maiden distant deployment on 30 December 2020 along with tug Nikolay Chiker under the command of the Captain 1st rank Vladimir Malakhovsky. On 14 January 2021, the ship entered the Mediterranean Sea through the Strait of Gibraltar. On 18 January 2021, she paid a visit to Algeria. On 26 January 2021, the accompanying tug Nikolay Chiker visited Limassol, Cyprus. Both ships visited the Greek port of Piraeus on 3 February 2021 and, between 16 and 18 February 2021, the Egyptian port of Alexandria. In February 2021, tanker Vyazma joined the ship detachment. Between 2-4 March, Admiral Kasatonov visited the Turkish naval base at Aksaz. Between 2-5 March, Nikolay Chiker and Vyazma called at Limassol again, and between 8-10 March, Admiral Kasatonov did too. She also called at Tartus, Syria.

On 15 March, the ship was monitoring French amphibious assault helicopter carrier Tonnerre, which had been approaching Cyprus from the direction of Crete. The carrier strike group of  had also been active in the area, after exercises with the Greek Navy on 11 March. From 23 to 26 March, the ship returned to Piraeus to participate in commemorations for the 200th anniversary of Greek independence (Celebration of 25th of March 1821). On 2 April, the ship detachment transited the Gibraltar strait westwards.

On 23 April, Admiral Kasatonov returned to Severomorsk, being greeted by the commander of the Russian Navy Nikolay Yevmenov, and the commander of the Northern Fleet, Aleksandr Moyseev. Nikolay Chiker and Vyazma had returned to base the prior week.

2022/2023 

On 7 February 2022, the frigate deployed to the Mediterranean Sea along with destroyer Vice-Admiral Kulakov, cruiser Marshal Ustinov and tanker Vyazma, strengthening the permanent task force there. Later on, the ship was denied access to the Black Sea after Turkey closed the Turkish Straits to all foreign warships. The battle group left the Mediterranean on 24 August 2022, returning to the Severomorsk, while Admiral Kasatonov stayed in the Mediterranean.

In late November, she was absent from Tartus, likely shadowing French aircraft carrier, deployed to the East Mediterranean. In early 2023, Admiral Kasatonov departed the Mediterranean to return to Murmansk accompanied by the tanker Akademik Pashin.

References 

Frigates of the Russian Navy
Admiral Gorshkov-class frigates
Ships built at Severnaya Verf
2014 ships